Ondřej Karafiát (born 1 December 1994) is a professional Czech football defender currently playing for Mladá Boleslav in the Czech First League on loan from Slavia Prague.

Career
He made his senior league debut for Viktoria Žižkov on 3 August 2014 in a Czech National Football League 2-1 home win against Olomouc. He scored his first senior league goal on 11 September 2014 in a 4-0 home win against Kolín.

On 3 August 2020, he signed a four-year contract with Slavia Prague.

Career statistics

Club

References

External links 
 
 Ondřej Karafiát official international statistics

Czech footballers
1994 births
Living people
Czech First League players
FK Viktoria Žižkov players
SK Dynamo České Budějovice players
FC Slovan Liberec players
Footballers from Prague
Association football defenders
Czech National Football League players
SK Slavia Prague players
FK Mladá Boleslav players